Lotti Lobsiger-Schibli (14 July 1912 – 2 July 1975) was a Swiss painter. Her work was part of the painting event in the art competition at the 1948 Summer Olympics.

References

1912 births
1975 deaths
20th-century Swiss painters
20th-century Swiss women artists
Swiss women painters
Olympic competitors in art competitions
Artists from Bern